The Battle of the Hydaspes was fought between Alexander the Great and Porus in May of 326 BC. It took place on the banks of the Hydaspes River in Punjab, as part of Alexander's Indian campaign. In what was possibly their most costly engagement, the Macedonian army secured a decisive victory over the Pauravas and captured Porus. Large areas of Punjab were subsequently absorbed into the Macedonian Empire; Porus was reinstated as the region's ruler after Alexander, having developed a newfound respect for the fierce resistance put up by Porus and his army, appointed him as a satrap.

In spite of close Indian surveillance, Alexander's decision to cross the monsoon-swollen Hydaspes in order to catch Porus's army in the flank has been referred to as one of his "masterpieces" in combat. The Macedonians' engagement with the Indians at Hydaspes remains a very significant historical event with regard to the Wars of Alexander the Great, as it resulted in the exposure of Greek political and cultural influences to the Indian subcontinent, thereby yielding works such as Greco-Buddhist art, which would continue to impact Greeks and Indians for centuries to come.

Location
The battle took place on the east bank of the Hydaspes River (now called the Jhelum River, a tributary of the Indus River) in what is now the Punjab Province of Pakistan. Alexander later founded the city of Nicaea on the site; this city has yet to be discovered. Any attempt to find the ancient battle site is complicated by considerable changes to the landscape over time. For the moment, the most plausible location is just south of the city of Jhelum, where the ancient main road crossed the river and where a Buddhist source mentions a city that may be Nicaea. The identification of the battle site near modern Jalalpur/Haranpur is certainly erroneous, as the river (in ancient times) meandered far from these cities.

Background
After Alexander defeated the last of the Achaemenid Empire's forces under Bessus and Spitamenes in 328 BC, he began a new campaign to further extend his empire towards India in 327 BC. After fortifying Bactria with 10,000 men, Alexander commenced his invasion of India through the Khyber Pass. Whilst possessing a much larger army, at the battle, an estimated 40,000 infantry and 5,000 cavalry crossed the river in time to engage the enemy. During this battle, Alexander suffered heavy losses compared to his earlier victories.

The primary Greek column entered the Khyber Pass, but a smaller force under the personal command of Alexander went through the northern route, taking the fortress of Aornos (modern-day Pir-Sar) along the way—a place of mythological significance to the Greeks as, according to legend, Herakles had failed to occupy it when he campaigned in India. Here, the Hindu clans of Hindu Kush gave Alexander's army the toughest opposition they had faced, but Alexander still emerged victorious, despite being outnumbered, depending on the source, somewhere between 3:1 and 5:1.

In early spring of the next year, Alexander formed an alliance with Taxiles (local name Ambhi), the King of Taxila.  They combined their forces against Taxiles's neighbour, the King of Hydaspes, Porus the Elder, who had chosen to spurn Alexander's command for him to surrender and was preparing for war.

Motives
Alexander had to subdue Porus the Elder in order to keep marching east. To leave such a strong opponent at his flanks would have endangered any further exploits. Alexander could not afford to show any weakness if he wanted to keep the loyalty of the already subdued Indian princes. Porus had to defend his kingdom and chose the perfect spot to check Alexander's advance. Although he lost the battle, he became the most successful recorded opponent of Alexander. According to historian Peter Green, Porus's performance in the battle out-classed both Memnon of Rhodes and Spitamenes.

Pre-battle manoeuvres

Alexander fixed his camp in the vicinity of the town of Jhelum on the north banks of the river. In the spring of 326 BC, Porus drew up on the south bank of the Jhelum River to repel any crossing. The Jhelum River was deep and fast enough that any attempt at a crossing would probably doom the attacking force. Alexander knew that a direct approach had little chance of success and tried to find alternative fords. He moved his mounted troops up and down the river bank each night while Porus shadowed him.

This was where an uninhabited, wood-covered island divided the river. While leading his troops across, he landed on the island, while his troops waded across. His plan was a classic pincer manoeuvre. He would eventually attack Indian cavalry flanking both sides of Porus's main force from the right. He left his general, Craterus, behind with most of the army, to make sure Porus would not find out about his crossing, while he crossed the river upstream with a strong contingent, consisting, according to the 2nd century AD Greek historian Arrian, of 6,000 on foot and 5,000 on horseback, though it was probably larger. Craterus was ordered to either ford the river and attack if Porus faced Alexander with all his troops or to hold his position if Porus faced Alexander with only part of his army. The other forces commanded by Meleager, Attalus, and Gorgias were ordered to cross the river in various places during the manoeuvre.

Alexander's crossing of the Hydaspes in the face of Indian forces on the opposite bank was a notable achievement. The complex preparations for the crossing were accomplished with the use of numerous feints and other forms of deception. Porus was kept continuously on the move until he decided it was a bluff and relaxed. On every visit to the site of the crossing, Alexander made a detour inland to maintain the secrecy of the plan. It was also reported that there was an Alexander look-alike who held sway in a mock royal tent near the base.

Alexander quietly moved his part of the army upstream and then traversed the river in utmost secrecy, using ‘skin floats filled with hay’ as well as ‘smaller vessels cut in half, the thirty oared galleys into three’. Furthermore, Craterus engaged in frequent feints suggesting that he may cross the river. As a result, Porus, 'no longer expecting a sudden attempt under cover of darkness, was lulled into a sense of security.' Alexander mistakenly landed on an island, but soon crossed to the other side. Porus perceived his opponent's manoeuvre and sent a small cavalry and chariot force under his son, also named Porus, to fight them off, hoping that he would be able to prevent his crossing. By chance a storm occurred that night which drowned out the sounds of the crossing.

Having crossed the river, Alexander advanced towards the location of Porus's camp with all his horsemen and foot archers, leaving his phalanx to follow up behind.  Upon meeting with young Porus's force, his horse archers showered the latter with arrows, while his heavy cavalry immediately charged without forming into line of battle.  Young Porus also faced an unexpected disadvantage: his chariots were immobilized by the mud near the shore of the river.  His small force was completely routed by Alexander's outnumbering cavalry, with he himself among the dead. As news reached the elder Porus, he understood that Alexander had crossed to his side of the river and hastened to face him with the best part of his army, leaving behind a small detachment to disrupt the landing of Craterus's force should he attempt to cross the river.

Battle

Eventually the two forces met and arrayed themselves for the battle.  The Indians were poised with cavalry on both flanks, fronted by their chariots, while their center comprising infantry with war elephants stationed every fifty feet in front of them, to deter the Macedonian cavalry.  The Indian war elephants were heavily armoured and had castle-like howdahs on their back carrying a trio of archers and javelin men. Porus's soldiers were dressed in flamboyantly hued outfits with steel helmets, bright scarves and baldrics, and wielded axes, lances and maces. Porus, eschewing the usual tradition of Indian kings fighting from a chariot, was mounted atop his tallest war elephant.  This animal in particular was not equipped with a howdah, as the king was clad in chain mail armour and hence had no need of the additional protection of a tower.

Alexander, noticing that Porus's disposition was strongest in the center, decided to attack with his cavalry first on the flanks, having his phalanx hold back until the Indian cavalry had been neutralized.  The Macedonian heavy infantry phalanx were outnumbered 1:5 against the Indian infantry. However the latter were at significant disadvantage in close combat due to their lack of armour and the long reach of their opponent's sarissas. Even their heavy armour-piercing bows were inaccurate because of the slippery ground, though the muddy ground was also an advantage to the lighter-armored Indians.

Alexander commenced the battle by sending his Dahae horse archers to harass the Indian right-wing cavalry. His armoured Companion cavalry was sent to attack their outnumbered Indian counterparts on the left wing, with Alexander himself leading the charge as was his habit. The rest of the Indian cavalry galloped to the aid of their hard-pressed kinsmen from the right wing, but Coenus's squadrons promptly followed their movement and attacked them from the rear. The Indian horsemen tried to form a double phalanx to face both attacks, but the necessary complicated manoeuvres brought even more confusion into their ranks, making it easier for the Macedonian cavalry to defeat them.  The Indian cavalry were thus routed, and fled to the safety of their elephants.

The war elephants now advanced against the Macedonian cavalry, only to be confronted by the Macedonian phalanx.  The powerful beasts caused heavy losses among the Macedonian foot, impaling many men with their steel-clad tusks and heaving some of them into the air before pulverizing them, and trampling and disorganizing their dense lines. Nevertheless, the Macedonian infantry resisted the attack bravely, with light infantry who tossed javelins at the elephants' mahouts and eyes while the heavy infantry attempted to hamstring the elephants with the two-sided axes and kopis. Meanwhile, the Indian horsemen attempted another sally, only to be repulsed once again by Alexander's cavalry squadrons, who had all massed together.  The elephants were eventually repulsed and fled back to their own lines. Many of their mahouts had been struck down by Macedonian missiles before they could kill their panicked mounts with poisoned rods, and hence the maddened animals wrought enormous havoc, trampling many of their own infantry and cavalry to death.   Finally, the Macedonian pezhetairoi locked their shields and advanced upon the confused enemy mass, while the Macedonian cavalry charged from the rear in a classic "hammer and anvil" manoeuvre, putting the entire Indian army to rout. Meanwhile, Craterus and his force in the base camp had succeeded in crossing the river, and arriving just at the right moment proceed to conduct a thorough pursuit on the fleeing Indians.

Throughout the battle, Alexander is said to have observed with growing admiration the valour of Porus, and understood that Porus intended to die in combat rather than be captured. Hoping to save the life of such a competent leader and warrior, Alexander commanded Taxiles to summon Porus for surrender. However, Porus became enraged on the very sight of his nemesis and tossed a spear at him in fury without bothering to listen to his proposal. Porus's aggressive response forced Taxiles to take flight on his steed. In a similar manner, many other messengers dispatched by the determined Alexander were spurned until at last Meroes, a personal friend of Porus, convinced him to listen to Alexander's message. Overpowered by thirst, the weary Porus finally dismounted his war elephant and demanded water. After being refreshed, he allowed himself to be taken to Alexander. On hearing that the Indian King was approaching, Alexander himself rode out to meet him and the famous surrender meeting took place.

According to Arrian, Macedonian losses amounted to 80 foot soldiers, ten horse archers, twenty of the Companions and 200 other horsemen. However the military historian J.F.C. Fuller saw Diodorus's casualty figures of 1,000 men killed as more realistic.  This was certainly a high figure for the victorious army, and more than the Macedonian losses at Gaugamela, yet not improbable considering the partial success of the Indian war elephants.  Indian losses amounted to 23,000 according to Arrian, 12,000 dead and over 9,000 men captured according to Diodorus. The last two numbers are remarkably close, so it might be assumed that Arrian added any prisoners to the total Indian casualties. Among the Indian leadership, two sons of Porus and his relative and ally Spitakes were killed during the battle, as well as most of his chieftains. Around 80 elephants were captured alive. Alexander also acquired an additional 70 war elephants due to the late arrival of reinforcements called for by King Porus after the battle was already over, who readily surrendered and offered these beasts as a tribute.

Aftermath and legacy

When asked by Alexander how he wished to be treated, Porus replied "Treat me as a king would treat another king". Impressed, Alexander indeed treated him like a king, allowing him to retain his lands. Following the battle, Alexander founded two cities in this region, one at the spot of the battle called Nicaea (Greek for Victory) in commemoration of his success and one on the other side of the Hydaspes called Alexandria Bucephalus, to honour his faithful steed, which died soon after this battle.

In 326 BC, the army of Alexander approached the boundaries of the Nanda Empire. His army, exhausted from the continuous campaigning and concerned at the prospect of facing yet another gigantic Indian army, demanded that they should return to the west. This happened at the Hyphasis (modern Beas).  Historians do not consider that this action by Alexander's troops represented a mutiny but called it an increase in military unrest amongst the troops, which forced Alexander to finally give in. Instead of immediately turning back, however, he ordered the army to march south, along the Indus, securing the banks of the river as the borders of his empire.

The main reasons for Porus's defeat were Alexander's use of clever tactics, and the Macedonians' superior discipline and technology. The Indians used chariots which were inferior to the Greek's cavalry. They did not have a well supported military infrastructure or a standing army. The Indian infantry and cavalry were poorly armoured, lacking in metal armour, and their swords were no match against the sarissa of the Macedonians. Porus himself failed to take the initiative, mainly trying to counter his opponent's moves. Greek historians agree that Porus fought bravely until the end.

During the later rule of the Maurya Empire, tactician Kautilya took the Battle of the Hydaspes as a lesson and highlighted the need for military training before battle. The first Mauryan emperor, Chandragupta, maintained a standing army. The chariot corps played a marginal role in Mauryan military infrastructure.

Notes

References

Citations

Sources

Modern

Green, Peter (1974). Alexander of Macedon: A Historical Biography. 
 
 
Rogers, Guy (2004). Alexander: The Ambiguity of Greatness. New York: Random House.

Ancient
Diodorus Siculus (90-30 BC). Bibliotheca Historica.
Quintus Curtius Rufus (60-70 AD). Historiae Alexandri Magni.
Plutarch (75 AD). The Life of Alexander the Great, Parallel Lives.

Metz Epitome.

External links
Hydaspes (Jhelum)

Hydaspes River
Hydaspes River
Military history of India
326 BC
History of India
Wars involving ancient India
320s BC conflicts
Foreign relations of ancient India